WFLI (1070 kHz) is a commercial AM radio station broadcasting an oldies radio format. Licensed to Lookout Mountain, Tennessee, the station serves the Chattanooga metropolitan area.  WFLI is owned by Tri-State Radio, Inc.

By day, WFLI broadcasts at 50,000 watts, the maximum for commercial AM stations in the U.S.  But 1070 AM is a clear channel frequency reserved for KNX Los Angeles.  So WFLI must reduce power at night to 2,500 watts to avoid interference.  It uses a directional antenna at all times.  Programming is also heard on 250 watt FM translator W241AF at 96.1 MHz. (which formerly carried WUSY-HD2) in addition to a second translator for coverage in areas located north of downtown Chattanooga, W262DQ at 100.3 MHz.

History
On February 20, 1961, WFLI signed on with 10,000 watts.  As at Top 40 station, it competed with the other AM radio stations in the Chattanooga market such as WDXB and WOGA (later WMOC) for the young adult market. The station's power was boosted to 50,000 watts in 1967.

From 1961 to 1980, WFLI was a popular contemporary hits station in the Chattanooga area. It was nicknamed  "Jet Fli".  The station also held two concerts each year called "WFLI Jet-Fli Spectaculars". These concerts attracted large crowds to Memorial Auditorium. The WFLI Light in the Sky projected a spotlight in the sky, attracting listeners to businesses and events.

By 1979, FM was becoming popular and the new WSKZ (KZ-106) captured most of WFLI's audience. After a two-year switch to a country music format, WFLI switched to a religious format in 1982, branding itself as "The Mid South's Most Powerful AM Gospel Station" with a Southern gospel music format in its later years.

WFLI signed off the air on March 31, 2017, but returned to the air under new management with a talk format in May 2017. On July 10, 2017, a one-day-only 1960s–1970s oldies format honored the station's heritage. It switched back to a talk format by July 11, airing the syndicated programs of Laura Ingraham, Dave Ramsey, Todd Starnes, Eric Metaxas and morning duo Rick Burgess and Bill "Bubba" Bussey.

On April 23, 2018, the station returned to a 1960s and 1970s oldies music format featuring live and local DJs. WFLI also began carrying some special features highlighting the station's past through locally-produced programming such as the "Daily Downbeat" show featuring former station alumni from the station's original 'JET FLI' era of the 1960s and 70s along with other notable or retired broadcasters from other area stations from the same era.

In July 2021, WFLI began to naturally-evolve the 1960s and 1970s "Oldies" format into a more standard Classic Hits format, moving the station musically into music centered more in the 1970s and 1980s with some top chart hits from the early- to mid-1990s. Now they play a range of artists from the 1970s through the 1990s including Bon Jovi, Fleetwood Mac, Journey, Madonna, Michael Jackson, The Eagles and other Contemporary Hit Radio chart-toppers from that same era.

WFLI is the flagship station for UTC Chattanooga Mocs athletics, carrying University of Tennessee Chattanooga football and basketball with Learfield Sports.

Translator

References

External links

David Carroll's Chattanooga Radio and TV

FLI
Hamilton County, Tennessee
Radio stations established in 1961
1961 establishments in Tennessee
Oldies radio stations in the United States